The 2024 United States presidential election in Florida is scheduled to take place on Tuesday, November 5, 2024, as part of the 2024 United States elections in which all 50 states plus the District of Columbia will participate. Florida voters will choose electors to represent them in the Electoral College via a popular vote. The state of Florida has 30 electoral votes in the Electoral College, following reapportionment due to the 2020 United States census in which the state gained a seat.

Incumbent Democratic president Joe Biden has stated that he intends to run for reelection to a second term.

Primary elections

Republican primary

The Florida Republican primary is scheduled to be held on March 19, 2024, alongside primaries in Arizona, Illinois, and Ohio.

Democratic primary

Primary polling

General election

Polling
Donald Trump vs. Joe Biden

Ron DeSantis vs. Joe Biden

Donald Trump vs. Kamala Harris

Ron DeSantis vs. Kamala Harris

Donald Trump vs. Hillary Clinton

Ron DeSantis vs. Hillary Clinton

See also 
 United States presidential elections in Florida
 2024 United States presidential election
 2024 Democratic Party presidential primaries
 2024 Republican Party presidential primaries
 2024 United States elections

Notes

Partisan clients

References 

Florida
2024
Presidential